The 1974–75 season was Manchester United's 73rd season in the Football League, and their first as a Second Division team since 1937–38, following relegation from the First Division at the end of the previous season.

The board of directors had kept faith in manager Tommy Docherty despite United's relegation, and he delivered an instant return to the First Division by guiding United to the Second Division title. Despite being a second division side, their average home attendance of 47,781 was still the highest in the country that season.

Second Division

FA Cup

League Cup

Squad statistics

References

Manchester United F.C. seasons
Manchester United